The Wych Elm cultivar Ulmus glabra 'Grandidentata', listed as U. glabra var. grandidentata (Moss), may have been the tree first described by Dumortier in Florula Belgica, 25, 1827, as U. corylacea var. grandidentata (:large-toothed hazel-like elm), in cultivation before 1830. Green thought it a synonym of 'Cornuta'. 'Grandidentata' may be synonymous with U. glabra 'Corylifolia' (:hazel-leaved elm), which Green thought another synonym of 'Cornuta'.

Description
The name implies distinctively large marginal teeth, perhaps differing from the 'horns' of 'Cornuta'.

Pests and diseases
'Grandidenta' is susceptible to Dutch Elm disease.

Cultivation
No authoritatively identified specimens are known to survive.

Putative specimens
A mature open-grown large-toothed U. glabra cultivar, matching a 1903 herbarium leaf-specimen mislabelled U. montana cucullata, stands in Niddrie Mains Road, Edinburgh (grafted at ground level; girth 1.4 m) (2016). The large teeth are present along the whole leaf-margin of short shoot-leaves as well as long ('Cornuta'). Though 'Cornuta'-like teeth may occur near the apex, they are rare, and do not resemble the slender 'horns' that usually appear in 'Cornuta' photographs. The tree is narrow-pyramidal, with upswept branches like a Huntingdon Elm.

Synonymy

Ulmus corylacea var. grandidentata: Dumortier, Florula Belgica, 25, 1827 ? 
Ulmus Montana (: glabra)  var. corylifolia: Zapalowicz, Conspectus Florae Galiciae Criticus 2: 98, 1908 ?

References

External links
  Sheet described as U. montana cucullata [error for 'cornuta' (?)] (1903)

Wych elm cultivar
Ulmus articles with images
Ulmus